"80's Romance" is a song by English new wave/pop band The Belle Stars. It is their eleventh single overall, and the band's final single as a seven-piece. 80's Romance was overall the band's least successful single to chart, peaking at #71.

Background
80's Romance is a Torch song that conveys the singer and the lover not seeing each other like lovers should. The singer claims her "heart is cold". This possibly means that the singer thinks her love has been denied by her lover, even though some other lyrics in the song conflict with that message.

Music video
The music video for the song shows the band setting their stage up for the music video and then shows them in their dressing room. Jennie Matthias spins around, showing off her outfit, while Miranda Joyce is shown wearing a wig of Sarah-Jane Owen's hairstyle. Towards the end of the video, the band is shown attempting to run through a glass wall. Sarah-Jane Owen is the first person to break through the wall, which is revealed to actually be Miranda Joyce still wearing the wig from before. She is then applauded. The rest of the music video shows the band doing their dance routine for the chorus that is played throughout earlier in the video. The band then experiments with cameras etc. and the video exits by reversing the single cover where the band's animated faces are replaced with their real faces which was also something shown at the beginning of the video.

References

External links
"Belle Stars, The - 80's Romance." Discogs.

1984 singles
The Belle Stars songs
1984 songs
Stiff Records singles
Torch songs